Chris P. Johnson is a South Dakota politician, and currently serves in the South Dakota House of Representatives since 2019. Johnson was elected as the South Dakota House of Representatives Assistant Majority Leader for 2021-2022.

Election history

References

Living people
Republican Party members of the South Dakota House of Representatives
21st-century American politicians
Politicians from Rapid City, South Dakota
Year of birth missing (living people)